Cheney School is a secondary school and sixth form with academy status, located in Headington, Oxford, England. It serves the Headington and East Oxford area as a destination for students from primary schools across the city. Rupert Moreton, was appointed as head teacher in 2017, replacing Jolie Kirby who now heads the Community School Alliance Trust, the multi-academy trust that runs Cheney. He was replaced in 2020 by Rob Pavey.

History
The foundation was around 1797. It then moved to New Inn Hall Street in 1901 under the name of Oxford Central Girls School. The building it occupied at that time is now part of St Peter's College of Oxford University. Eventually the school became Cheney Girls' School. The Junior Day Department of the Oxford Technical College moved to the same site under the name Cheney School, a separate, mixed secondary technical school. For four years, between 1957 and 1961 boys only were admitted (Cheney Boys School) after which girls were again admitted from 1962. Together they were usually known as Cheney Mixed. In 1972 the two schools merged to form the new mixed comprehensive school, Cheney School. In 2003, Cheney School changed from being upper school, for children aged 13 to 18, to a secondary school serving children aged 11 to 18, in the two tier system. In January 2013, the school become an academy.

Students
The school has over 1500 pupils, aged 11–18.

Specialist Status
When the UK government began awarding grants to schools specialising in areas of the curriculum, Cheney School decided to become a Language College. Using the grant money, they built a language computer laboratory and added extra in-classroom IT equipment.

Cheney School was awarded a second specialism and picked Student Leadership, which enables more "Student Leaders" (mostly in sports and languages), and concentrates primarily on the student voice.

Cheney School is host to and also partner organisation for the Iris Community Classics Centre which is founded and run by The Iris Project

Cheney School became the first school in the UK to host a museum working within the Arts Council Accreditation scheme, the Rumble Museum, in May 2015.

Notable former students
 Andy Bell - bass guitarist of Oasis, singer, guitarist and songwriter of Ride
 Mark Gardener - singer, guitarist and songwriter of Ride
 Steve Queralt - bassist, synths and songwriter of Ride
 Emily Berrington - actress
 Bryony Shaw - Olympic windsurfer
 Roy Thomason - former Conservative MP
 Clive Walker - footballer for Chelsea FC and Sunderland
 Danny Dorling - Halford Mackinder Professor of Geography at Oxford University 
 Adam Lee - songwriter producer keyboard player of Let Loose, Skin Games making history as the first musicians to perform in Romania after the revolution

Buildings
Chadwick (English, Art, PSHE, PE Offices)
Wainright (Maths, Science, Drama), school library, reception and medical room
Lane (History, Geography, Languages, RE)
John Brookes  (DT, ICT, Business & Enterprise)
Russell (Science, Maths)
Music (Music)
Sports Hall/Gymnasium (PE)
Brighouse (Science, Maths)
Music is attached to the Assembly Hall and the Community Hall

The Brighouse building was opened in November 2016, and is named after Sir Tim Brighouse.

References

External links
Official website

Secondary schools in Oxfordshire
Educational institutions established in 1797
Schools in Oxford
1797 establishments in England
Academies in Oxfordshire